The Piano Guys is the second studio album, and first on a major record label, by American musical group The Piano Guys. It was released on October 2, 2012 through Sony Masterworks. The album is composed primarily of covers and mashups of classical and popular music.

Track listing

Notes

Personnel
Per liner notes
The Piano Guys
Steven Sharp Nelson - producer, electric, acoustic and steel cellos, piano and cello percussion, light saber on "Cello Wars", additional percussion, piano and vocals
Jon Schmidt - piano, piano and vocal percussion, additional vocals and production
Al van der Beek  - producer, percussion, additional piano, piano percussion and vocals
Tel Stewart - videography
Paul Anderson - videography, editing

Additional musicians
Alex Boyé - lead vocals on "Peponi (Paradise)"
Julie Ann Nelson - additional vocals on "Beethoven's 5 Secrets"
Matthew John Nelson - additional vocals on "Beethoven's 5 Secrets"
Lyceum Philharmonic Orchestra - orchestration on "Beethoven's 5 Secrets"
Kayson Brown - conducting on "Beethoven's 5 Secrets"

Commercial performance
As of June 2013, the album had sold more than 135,000 copies in the United States.

Charts

Weekly charts

Year-end charts

Certifications and sales

Release history

References 

2012 classical albums
Sony Music albums
The Piano Guys albums